Asghar Massombagi is an Iranian-Canadian film director, most noted for his 2001 film Khaled.

Born and raised in Tehran, he moved to Canada at age 18, and studied film at Simon Fraser University and the Canadian Film Centre. He made the short films Feel Like Chicken Tonight (1998) and The Miracle (1999) prior to the premiere of Khaled at the 2001 Toronto International Film Festival. The film received an honorable mention for the FIPRESCI International Critics Award, and was named to TIFF's annual year-end Canada's Top Ten list for 2001.

He won the Best Director Award for the film at the 37th Karlovy Vary International Film Festival, and the First Time Filmmaker Award at the ReelWorld Film Festival.

In 2005 he released the short film Rose, and an episode of the television series Robson Arms.

In 2020 he was a participant in Greetings from Isolation, a project featuring short films by 45 Canadian directors about the COVID-19 pandemic in Canada.

References

External links

Iranian film directors
Iranian emigrants to Canada
Canadian television directors
People from Tehran
Living people
Simon Fraser University alumni
Canadian Film Centre alumni
Year of birth missing (living people)